Criton or Crito (Greek: Κρίτων) may refer to:

Ancient world
Crito, dialogue of Plato
Crito of Alopece, follower of Socrates
Criton, comic poet of the new comedy style
Criton the Macedonian, Olympic winner in 328 BC 
Criton of Pieria, historian
Criton of Aegae, Pythagorean philosopher
Criton and Nicolaus of Athens, sculptors of the 1st century AD
Criton of Heraclea in Caria (Titus Statilius Crito) (c. 100 AD), Greek chief physician and procurator of Trajan

Modern world
 Crito, a pen-name of Charles Lamb
Pascale Criton, French musicologist

Criton, an ingredient present in Korean Soju (alcoholic beverage).